Pattathu Arasan is an 2022 Tamil-language sports action drama film written and directed by A. Sarkunam and produced by Allirajah Subaskaran of Lyca Productions. It stars Atharvaa, Rajkiran, Ashika Ranganath & Raadhika Sarathkumar in the lead roles. The plot is set against the backdrop of green-caped betel farms near Thiruvaiyaru. The music of the film is composed by Ghibran, while Loganathan Srinivasan handled the cinematography and editing done by Raja Mohammad. The film was released theatrically on 25th November 2022. It received mixed to positive reviews from critics and became a commercial success.

Plot
Poththaari is a former kabaddi player, who is widely regarded as one of the greatest players in his village. Poththaari has two wives. His family is a large family with children and grand children, who live happily in the same house.  From his first wife he has 2 sons and 1 daughter and grandchildren. His eldest son is Thavamani and his second son is Sachimuthu.  His second wife is dead. The whole family lives together happily. 

One day, Poththaari sends his son Kannaihan, from his second wife, to play in a kabbadi match, where he unfortunately dies. Kannaihan's wife, Vijaya demands Poththaari to split his land in half to which Poththari agrees. After that Vijaya and her son Chinnadurai cut ties with Poththaari and his family and start to live separately, which makes him sad.

Few years later, the whole village is celebrating Poththaari's 70th birthday as an auspicious occasion, where the children and grandchildren get their blessings from the elder couple. Chinnadurai seeks his blessing too and also tries to ask forgiveness to Poththaari and his family but they don't accept it and also his mother disagrees on him going to his grandfather's function. 

One day, Poththaari's grandson Chelliah, who is a kabbadi player, gets a call from Tamil Thalaivaas coach Bhaskar, who had asked him to send his personal details. Sadagoppan, the grandson of the village president Peramaiyan gets to know of the conversation and informs it to Peramaiyan, who calls the minister to confirm that Chelliah got selected to play for the Kabbadi team Tamil Thalavalas, who will is to play in the Pro - Kabbadi tournament. The next day, Bhaskar asks him to come to The Tamil Thalaivaas office in Chennai and to get mat practice.  To get mat practice he needs to buy mat which would cost Rs. 3 lakh rupees, which he cannot afford. So, he asks Sadagoppan for help and he arranges a financier to get Chelliah a loan. When Chelliah goes to The Tamil Thalaivaas office, they inform him that Mr Bhaskar is out-of-station.  On Chelliah getting money from a financier and Sadagoppan gets hold CCTV footage and falsely blames Chelliah for receiving money to not play in the match between Arasakulam and Kalayarkovil, Poththaari and his family are not allowed to due to this. Because of the stress, Chelliah hangs himself.

Did Poththaari and his family reunite due to this, forms the rest of the story.

Cast

Production
The film was tentatively titled as Atharvaa 18. On 10 November 2022, the title of the film was announced to be Pattathu Arasan, with Lyca Productions releasing the first look poster of the film. Sandalwood actress Ashika Ranganath was roped in to play the female lead in this film. The film was majorly shot at the betel leaf plantation near Thanjavur.

Music

The music of the film is composed by Ghibran which marks his second collaboration with Atharvaa after Trigger and third collaboration with A. Sarkunam after Vaagai Sooda Vaa and Naiyaandi. The first single titled "Yaaro Yaaro Iva" was released on 18 November 2022.

Release

Theatrical 
The film was released theatrically on 25 November 2022. The trailer of the film was released on 18 November 2022.

Home media 
The post theatrical streaming rights of the film has been sold to Netflix .

Reception
The film received mixed to positive reviews from critics.

Logesh Balachandran of The Times of India rated the film 2.5 out of 5 stars and wrote "Overall, Sarkunam's Pattathu Arasan might work for a few but wish someone would bring inventive ideas into this genre." Yuvashree of ABP Live gave 2.5 out of 5 stars and wrote "If only some of the cringe sentimental scenes had been trimmed and a bit more fight scenes had been included, the titular king would have really rocked the bandwagon."  Chandhini R of Cinema Express rated the film 2 out of 5 stars and wrote "Despite the never-ending barrage of rural dramas coming our way, it is a genre that still works because the right film made in this milieu can showcase the rootedness and vibe." Dinamalar rated the film 2.25 out of 5 stars. Sruthi Ganapathy Raman of Film Companion wrote "But when the film establishes the name of the only lead female character in the movie, well after 90 minutes into runtime, tokenism rears its ugly head. And its allegiance becomes clear." Ashwin Ram of Moviecrow gave the film’s rating 2 out  of 5 and wrote "An insane yet interesting conflict presented with a screenplay that should have been done decades ago and an emotional drama that doesn’t have any tension or rooting factors." A critic for Cinema Vikatan wrote that "Taking a familiar village story, the team of 'Pattathu Arasan' has created a boring film with scenes that are not new."

References

External links
 

2022 films
2020s Tamil-language films
Sports action films
Indian sports drama films